Quadriptilia obscurodactyla is a moth of the family Pterophoridae. It is known from Colombia and Ecuador.

The wingspan is about 32 mm.

External links

Pterophorinae
Moths described in 1994
Taxa named by Cees Gielis
Moths of South America